Rudolf Filkus (died 17 December 2013) was a Slovak politician. He died at the age of 86.

He served as the Minister of Finance from 16 March 1994 to 13 December 1994.

References

1920s births
2013 deaths
Finance ministers of Slovakia
Slovak politicians